"Revelation Song" is a song written by Jennie Lee Riddle with lyrics adapted from Revelation 4 of the New Testament. The song first gained exposure on U.S. Christian radio through a Christ for the Nations Institute recording, "Glorious" in 2004, as well as on Gateway Worship's debut album, Living for You in 2006, and subsequently included on Kari Jobe's self-titled album. It was later released by Phillips, Craig and Dean as the first single off Fearless.

Phillips, Craig and Dean cover

Release
Revelation Song was released by contemporary Christian group Phillips, Craig and Dean on May 5, 2009 as the lead single from their album Fearless. Their version quickly gained popularity, reaching No. 1 on Billboard'''s Hot Christian Songs chart in August 2009, and No. 31 on Billboards Heatseekers Songs. It was the longest-running number-one song in any format on Christian radio in 2009. In all, it spent over 15 weeks atop Billboards Hot Christian Adult Contemporary chart and 11 weeks atop Billboards Hot Christian Songs chart.

Band member Randy Phillips explained why the trio recorded the song:
This song captures the moment of looking up into Heaven, peeling back the curtain of eternity so we can peek in. If you keep your eyes on the Dow Jones or nuclear weapons in North Korea, you’ll always be nervous. Look to the awesomeness of God instead.

Chart history
Weekly charts

Year-end charts

Decade-end charts

Certifications

 Other cover versions 

Diante do Trono released a Portuguese version, "Canção do Apocalipse", on Aleluia in 2010.
Newsboys released "Revelation Song" on God's Not Dead in 2011.

Latin American worship leader Ingrid Rosario recorded a Spanish version, "Digno y Santo", on Cuan Gran Amor (What Great Love). Danilo Montero also recorded a live version with Kari Jobe on Devoción''.

Awards

In 2010, the song won a Dove Award for Worship Song of the Year at the 41st GMA Dove Awards. It was also nominated for Song of the Year.

References

2009 singles
Contemporary Christian songs
2009 songs